Micragrotis prosarca is a species of moth of the family Noctuidae. It is found in Africa, including South Africa.

External links
 

Noctuinae
Lepidoptera of South Africa
Lepidoptera of Zimbabwe
Moths of Sub-Saharan Africa